Graham Marc Verchere (born 4 February 2002) is a Canadian actor, known for roles in Stargirl, Fargo, The Good Doctor, and Summer of 84.

Early life
Verchere was born in Vancouver to Cynthia, a pediatric plastic surgeon at BC Children's Hospital, and Bruce, a diabetes researcher at the University of British Columbia. He has a twin brother and an older brother. Verchere and his twin brother became involved in acting because of their cousin.

Career 
In 2014, Verchere landed his first voice role in My Little Pony: Friendship Is Magic as Pip Squeak. In 2017, Verchere appeared as the recurring character Nathan Burgle in Fargo, Tommy Walters in the film Woody Woodpecker, and the role of young Shaun Murphy in The Good Doctor.

In 2018, Verchere appeared in the horror mystery film Summer of 84. On 21 August 2018, it was announced that Verchere would be starring as Leo Borlock in Disney's movie adaptation of Jerry Spinelli's young adult novel Stargirl. Stargirl was released on Disney+ on 13 March 2020.

Filmography

Film

Television

Music

Awards and nominations

References

External links

2002 births
Living people
Male actors from Vancouver
Canadian male child actors
Canadian male film actors
Canadian male television actors
Canadian male voice actors